NCL may refer to:

Places
 New Caledonia, French territory in the Pacific

Organizations
 National Carriers Limited, a former British road haulage company subsequently merged into Lynx Express
 National Central Library, China
 National Central Library (disambiguation) (various other libraries)
 National Chemical Laboratory, Pune, India
 National Consumers League, US
 Newcastle University
 Nintendo Company Limited, Japanese video game company
 Northern Coalfields, Indian coal company

Science
 Native chemical ligation, a chemical way to synthesize proteins
 Neuronal ceroid lipofuscinosis, neurodegenerative disorders
 nidopallium caudolaterale, part of the birdbrain's nidopallium 
 Nucleolin, a protein
 Nested Context Language
 NCAR Command Language
 NULL convention logic, a form of asynchronous logic

Sports
 National Conference League, a rugby league in the UK
 National Cricket League, Bangladesh
 North Coast League, a high school athletic conference in Ohio

Transport
 Newcastle International Airport, England
 Newcastle railway station, England
 North Coast railway line, Queensland, Australia
 North Coast railway line, New South Wales, Australia
 National City Lines, American transportation company
 Northern City Line, railway line in London
 Norwegian Cruise Line, a cruise ship company

See also

NCLS (disambiguation)